Branislav R. Milosavljević (Serbian Cyrillic: Бранислав Р. Милосављевић; 2 August 1879 – 17 April 1944) was a poet and a colonel of the Army of the Kingdom of Serbia, the first mayor of Durrës within Drač County and author of numerous patriotic poems, most notably the famous war poem Izgnanici, better known as Kreće se lađa francuska (The French Ship is Sailing).

During World War I, his patriotism inspired him to write stirring war songs, one which, Kreće se lađa francuska, was printed by the order of King Peter I of Serbia and distributed in the thousands. It was immediately transcribed into music.

In 1940, Milosavljević retired to his property at Belgrade, where he, by his vast library of books, devoted himself to literature for the rest of his life. Milosavljević's dramatic talent was characteristically Serbian, his poems were well constructed and effective, arousing emotions.

After returning from Nazi captivity, he was killed in Belgrade on 17 April 1944 as a result of the Allied bombing of Yugoslavia.

References 

1879 births
1944 deaths
Military personnel  from Požarevac
Royal Serbian Army soldiers
Serbian military personnel of the Balkan Wars
Serbian military personnel of World War I
Royal Yugoslav Army personnel of World War II
World War II prisoners of war held by Germany
Serbian male poets
Mayors of Durrës
20th-century Serbian people
Deaths by airstrike during World War II
Burials at Belgrade New Cemetery
Serbian civilians killed in World War II
Yugoslav prisoners of war
Poets from the Kingdom of Serbia